Robert Zubrin (born April 9, 1952) is an American aerospace engineer, author, and advocate for human exploration of Mars. He and his colleague at Martin Marietta, David Baker, were the driving force behind Mars Direct, a proposal in a 1990 research paper intended to produce significant reductions in the cost and complexity of such a mission. The key idea was to use the Martian atmosphere to produce oxygen, water, and rocket propellant for the surface stay and return journey.  A modified version of the plan was subsequently adopted by NASA as their "design reference mission". He questions the delay and cost-to-benefit ratio of first establishing a base or outpost on an asteroid or another Apollo program-like return to the Moon, as neither would be able to provide all of its own oxygen, water, or energy; these resources are producible on Mars, and he expects people would be there thereafter.

Disappointed with the lack of interest from government in Mars exploration and after the success of his book The Case for Mars (1996), as well as leadership experience at the National Space Society, Zubrin established the Mars Society in 1998. This is an international organization advocating a human mission to Mars as a goal, by private funding if possible.

Early life and education 
Zubrin was born in New York City's Brooklyn borough on April 9, 1952. His father was descended from Russian Jewish immigrants.

Qualifications and professional career 
Zubrin was awarded his first patent at age 20 in 1972 for Three Player Chess.

Zubrin holds a B.A. in Mathematics from the University of Rochester (1974); he was a science teacher for 7 years before becoming an engineer. He earned a M.S. in Nuclear Engineering (1984), a M.S. in Aeronautics and Astronautics (1986), and a Ph.D. in Nuclear Engineering (1992) — all from the University of Washington. He has developed a number of concepts for space propulsion and exploration, and is the author of over 200 technical and non-technical papers and several books. He is also President of both the Mars Society and Pioneer Astronautics, a private company that does research and development on innovative aerospace technologies. Zubrin is the co-inventor on a U.S. design patent and a U.S. utility patent on a hybrid rocket/airplane, and on a U.S. utility patent on an oxygen supply system (see links below).

Zubrin's inventions include the nuclear salt-water rocket and co-inventor (with Dana Andrews) of the magnetic sail. Zubrin is fellow at Center for Security Policy.

During his professional career, Zubrin was a member of Lockheed Martin's scenario development team charged with developing strategies for space exploration. He was also "a senior engineer with the Martin Marietta Astronautics company, working as one of its leaders in development of advanced concepts for interplanetary missions". During his time at Martin Marietta, he drafted ideas for a potential single-stage-to-orbit spacecraft, and developed the Black Colt. However, he would eventually leave Martin Marietta to co-form Pioneer Rocketplane with Mitchell Burnside Clapp, an aerospace engineer from the US Air Force, due to a perceived lack of interest in reducing launch costs at larger aerospace firms. In his book, Entering Space: Creating a Spacefaring Civilization, Zubrin would write about how both large aerospace firms, and the US Government, would fail to reduce the costs of spaceflight.

In 1998, Zubrin founded the Mars Society, and in the following years, was able to attract large amounts of public interest to potential human colonisation on Mars. The work of the Mars Society was successful enough as to encourage the US Government to not cut funding for several Mars rover missions.

Pioneer Energy 
In 2008, Zubrin founded Pioneer Energy, a research and development firm headquartered in Lakewood, Colorado. The company's focus is to develop mobile Enhanced Oil Recovery (EOR) systems that can enable CO2-based EOR for both small and large oil producers in the United States. The company has also developed a number of new processes for manufacturing synthetic fuels.

The ethics of terraforming 

Dr. Zubrin is known as an advocate of a moderately anthropocentric position in the ethics of terraforming. Discussions of the ethics of terraforming often make reference to a series of public debates Zubrin has held with his friend Christopher McKay, who advocates a moderately biocentric position on the ethics of terraforming. For example, a written account of some of these debates is available in On to Mars: Colonizing a New World, as a joint article, "Do indigenous Martian bacteria have precedence over human exploration?" (pp. 177–182)

Cultural references 
An aged Robert Zubrin also appears as a background character in The Martian Race (1999) by Gregory Benford, a science fiction novel depicting early human explorers on Mars in the very near future. Benford, who is also an astrophysicist, is a longtime member of both the board of directors and the steering committee of the Mars Society.

Zubrin was featured in a 2007 CBC News documentary special, The Passionate Eye, titled "The Mars Underground".

The songwriter and musician Frank Black (alias Black Francis of the Pixies) penned an homage to Zubrin, "Robert Onion", on the album Dog in the Sand. The lyrics are in the form of an acrostic, spelling "Robert The Case for Mars Zubrin".

In 2010 Robert Zubrin was featured in the Symphony of Science video "The Case for Mars" along with Carl Sagan, Brian Cox, and Penelope Boston.

The fictional character Dr. Zachary Walzer in the 2010–2011 independent VODO series Pioneer One was inspired by Zubrin.

In 2016, Zubrin was one of several scientists and engineers interviewed in the National Geographic miniseries Mars.

Bibliography

Books 
 The Case for Mars: The Plan to Settle the Red Planet and Why We Must (1996) 
 Islands in the Sky: Bold New Ideas for Colonizing Space (1996), co-edited with Stanley Schmidt. 
 From Imagination to Reality: Mars Exploration Studies of the Journal of the British Interplanetary Society : Precursors and Early Piloted Exploration Missions (1997). 
 From Imagination to Reality: Mars Exploration Studies of the Journal of the British Interplanetary Society : Base Building, Colonization and Terraformation (1997).
 Entering Space: Creating a Spacefaring Civilization (1999). 
 Proceedings of the Founding Convention of the Mars Society (1999), co-edited with Maggie Zubrin. 
 Mars On Earth: The Adventures of Space Pioneers in the High Arctic (2003). 
 First Landing (2001). 
 On to Mars: Colonizing a New World (2002 Apogee Books), co-edited with Frank Crossman. 
 The Holy Land (2003). 
 Benedict Arnold: A Drama of the American Revolution in Five Acts (2005). 
 On to Mars 2: Exploring and Settling a New World (2005 Apogee Books), co-edited with Frank Crossman. 
 Energy Victory: Winning the War on Terror by Breaking Free of Oil (2007). 
How to Live on Mars (2008).  
Merchants of Despair: Radical Environmentalists, Criminal Pseudo-Scientists, and the Fatal Cult of Antihumanism (2011). 
Mars Direct: Space Exploration, the Red Planet, and the Human Future (2013). 
 The Case for Space: How the Revolution in Spaceflight Opens Up a Future of Limitless Possibility Prometheus Books (2019)

Articles 
 1991, Mars Direct: A Simple, Robust, and Cost Effective Architecture for the Space Exploration Initiative, AIAA Journal 
 2004, Getting Space Exploration Right, The New Atlantis
 2006, An Energy Revolution, The American Enterprise
 2007, The Hydrogen Hoax, The New Atlantis

References

External links 
 
 

1952 births
Living people
21st-century American male writers
21st-century American non-fiction writers
21st-century American novelists
American aerospace engineers
American male non-fiction writers
American male novelists
American nuclear engineers
American people of Russian-Jewish descent
American satirists
American science fiction writers
American science writers
Analog Science Fiction and Fact people
Exploration of Mars
Lockheed Martin people
Martin Marietta people
Mars One
Mars Society
Space advocates
University of Washington College of Engineering alumni